Willow Wash may be:

An ephemeral stream or wash in:

Arizona
Willow Wash (Lake Havasu, Colorado River), Mohave County, Arizona
Willow Wash (San Pedro River), Cochise County, Arizona
Willow Wash (Day Wash), Navajo County, Arizona

California
Willow Wash (Willow Creek), Inyo County, California
Willow Wash (Seventeenmile Point, California) in San Bernardino County, California
Willow Wash (Ivanpah Valley), near Nipton, in San Bernardino County, California

Nevada
Willow Wash (Coils Creek), Eureka County, Nevada
Willow Wash (Cataract Wash), Clark County, Nevada

New Mexico
Willow Wash (Plumasano, Wash), Cibola County, New Mexico
Willow Wash (Alamo Wash), San Juan County, New Mexico